FK Rudar Ugljevik (Serbian Cyrillic: ФК Рудар Угљевик) is a football club from the town of Ugljevik, Republika Srpska, Bosnia and Herzegovina. The club played in the Premier League of Bosnia and Herzegovina during the 2004–05 season. However, they were relegated to the First League of the Republika Srpska at the end of the season.

Achievements
First League of Republika Srpska:
Winners (2): 1996–97, 1997–98

Republika Srpska Cup:
Winners (2): 1997–98, 1998–99

Players
For the list of current and former players with Wikipedia article, please see :Category:FK Rudar Ugljevik players.

Managers
 Zoran Jagodić
 Velimir Đorđević
 Milomir Odović
 Zvonko Ivezić
 Zvonko Živković
 Predrag Marić
 Dragomir Jovičić
 Goran Ljubojević

References

External links
 FK Rudar Ugljevik at FSRS

Association football clubs established in 1925
Football clubs in Bosnia and Herzegovina
Football clubs in Republika Srpska
Ugljevik
1925 establishments in Bosnia and Herzegovina
Ugljevik